Marko Milovanović (Serbian Cyrillic: Марко Миловановић; born 12 August 1982) is a Serbian former professional footballer who played as a defender.

Honours
Kolubara
 Serbian League Belgrade: 2013–14

External links
 Tavriya profile
 
 
 

Association football defenders
Expatriate footballers in Kazakhstan
Expatriate footballers in Russia
Expatriate footballers in Ukraine
FC Amkar Perm players
FC Okzhetpes players
First League of Serbia and Montenegro players
FK Javor Ivanjica players
FK Kolubara players
FK Smederevo players
Kazakhstan Premier League players
Russian Premier League players
SC Tavriya Simferopol players
Serbian expatriate footballers
Serbian expatriate sportspeople in Kazakhstan
Serbian expatriate sportspeople in Russia
Serbian expatriate sportspeople in Ukraine
Serbian First League players
Serbian football managers
Serbian footballers
Serbian SuperLiga players
Sportspeople from Valjevo
Ukrainian Premier League players
1982 births
Living people